India Arie Simpson (born October 3, 1975), also known as India Arie (sometimes styled as india.arie), is an American singer and songwriter. She has sold over five million records in the US and ten million worldwide. She has won four Grammy Awards from her 23 nominations, including Best R&B Album.

Background
India was born in Denver, Colorado, the daughter of Joyce and Ralph Simpson. Her musical skills were encouraged by both parents in her younger years. Her mother is a former singer (she was signed to Motown as a teenager and opened for Stevie Wonder and Al Green) and is now her stylist. She has an older brother named J'On and younger sister Mary A Martin of Philadelphia, Pennsylvania. Arie is African-American, and according to a DNA analysis, she descends from the Mende people of Sierra Leone, the Kru people of Liberia and the Fula people of Guinea-Bissau.

After Simpson's parents divorced, her mother moved the family to Atlanta, Georgia when India was 13. Simpson had taken up a succession of musical instruments throughout her schooling in Denver, but her interest in the guitar while attending the Savannah College of Art and Design, in Savannah, led to a personal revelation about songwriting and performing. "When I started tapping into my own sensitivity, I started to understand people better. It was a direct result of writing songs", she said at the press release of her debut album, Acoustic Soul.

Co-founding the Atlanta-based independent music collective Groovement EarthShare (Groovement was the collective artists' name and EarthShare was their independent label name), her one-song turn on a locally released compilation led to a second-stage gig at the 1998 Lilith Fair. In 1999, a Universal/Motown music scout signed her and made an introduction to former Motown CEO Kedar Massenburg. Arie resides in New York City.

Named to Oprah Winfrey's SuperSoul100 list of visionaries and influential leaders, India.Arie performed Songversation during 2017 motivational cruises.

Musical career
Arie released her debut album Acoustic Soul on March 27, 2001. The album was met with positive reviews and commercial success. Acoustic Soul debuted at number ten on the U.S. Billboard 200 and number three on the Top R&B/Hip-Hop Albums. Within months, without the concentrated radio airplay that typically powers pop and rap albums, Acoustic Soul was certified double platinum by the Recording Industry Association of America (RIAA), selling 2,180,000 copies in the U.S. and 3,000,000 copies worldwide.
The album was also certified Gold by the British Phonographic Industry
and platinum by Music Canada. The album was promoted with the release of the lead single "Video". "Video" attained commercial success peaking at 47 on the US Billboard Hot 100 and becoming her highest-charting song in the region to date. The album's second single "Brown Skin" failed to chart on the Billboard Hot 100, but it became her highest-charting single in the United Kingdom, peaking at number 29.

Arie performed a duet with rock singer-guitarist John Mellencamp on the song "Peaceful World" for his 2001 album Cuttin' Heads. While Arie and the album were nominated for seven Grammy awards in 2002, they won no awards, losing in five of seven categories to Alicia Keys. She closed the ceremony with a performance of her song "Video". Arie performed a duet with jazz singer Cassandra Wilson on the song "Just Another Parade" for her 2002 album Belly of the Sun.

Arie followed the success of her debut on September 24, 2002, with the release of Voyage to India. It debuted at number six on the Billboard 200 with first week sales of 109,000 copies and topped the Top R&B/Hip-Hop Albums, with the RIAA certifying it Platinum. At the 2003 Grammy Awards, it won Best R&B Album, and the single "Little Things" won Best Urban/Alternative Performance. The song "Get It Together" was featured on many film soundtracks including Brown Sugar (2002) and Shark Tale (2004).

On September 12, 2005, Arie performed "Just 4 2day", a song written for her appearance on the debut of The Tyra Banks Show. She also performed "What About the Child", a song that did not air but was made available as a one-dollar Internet download to support child victims of Hurricanes Katrina and Rita. Arie is also featured on Stevie Wonder's album A Time to Love, released on October 18, 2005. Arie and Wonder duet on the title track "A Time to Love", written by Arie, which was nominated for Best Pop Collaboration with Vocals at the 2006 Grammy Awards. Three years earlier, their rendition of Mel Tormé's 1944 classic "The Christmas Song", recorded for the holiday TV commercial for retailer Target, had been nominated for the same category, making it the first song created and financed exclusively for a commercial to be nominated for a Grammy Award.

The first-week sales of Arie's album Testimony: Vol. 1, Life & Relationship, 161,000 copies, are her best sales week to date. The album was certified gold in August 2006, selling 730,000 in US and 1,300,000 worldwide. "I Am Not My Hair", a collaboration with Akon, was the most successful release from Testimony: Vol. 1., reaching the U.S. Billboard Hot 100 at #97 and the UK Singles Chart at #65. On the April 16, 2007 episode of The Oprah Winfrey Show entitled "After Imus: Now What?", Arie guest-starred as a panelist. Arie performed a duet with singer Anthony David for his song "Words" for his 2008 album Acey Duecy.

Her next album, Testimony: Vol. 2, Love & Politics was released on Tuesday, February 10, 2009. It debuted at No. 3 on the Billboard 200, and No. 2 on the R&B chart. Within this CD, Arie collaborated with such artists as Sezen Aksu, Keb Mo, Gramps Morgan and Musiq Soulchild to fulfill her self-proclaimed desire to "do projects with people who are making music that is meaningful, with a lot of integrity and a lot of sonic diversity". Arie also identified this CD as her first to write and sing songs without worrying about public opinion after a much-needed vacation to Hawaii. The album was her first produced and released after her departure from Motown to Universal Records. Arie performed "Video" with British singer Adele at the 2009 VH1 Divas. Arie is one of over 70 artists singing on "We Are the World: 25 for Haiti", a charity single in aid of the 2010 Haiti earthquake. Arie contributed vocals to "Imagine" for the 2010 Herbie Hancock album, The Imagine Project along with Seal, Pink, Jeff Beck, Konono N°1, Oumou Sangare and others.

In the fall of 2010, she was a featured guest vocalist on Carlos Santana's version of The Beatles classic song "While My Guitar Gently Weeps" from his album Guitar Heaven. The song also features Yo-Yo Ma on cello.

In September 2012, she featured in a campaign called "30 Songs/30 Days" to support Half the Sky: Turning Oppression into Opportunity for Women Worldwide, a multi-platform media project inspired by Nicholas Kristof and Sheryl WuDunn's book.

In March 2013, it was announced that Arie was working on her upcoming fifth studio album, Songversation, which was released on June 25, 2013. The first single of the album, "6th Avenue", was released on iTunes on November 4, 2012; it was produced by India Arie and Israeli musician Idan Raichel. The second single "Cocoa Butter" was released on iTunes on April 9, 2013.

In 2015, she released a collaborative album with musician Joe Sample titled Christmas with Friends.

In July 2016, she premiered her new single "Breathe" inspired by the Black Lives Matter Movement, especially Eric Garner's last words. She also announced a new album titled Worthy was in the works. She performed the single on the Soul Train Awards with host Erykah Badu in November.

In June 2017, she announced the release of her first EP SongVersation: Medicine on June 30. It was preceded by the single "Breathe" and the new single "I Am Light" which was originally included on her 2013 Songversation album. She expressed that the EP was "made to be listened to in a quiet time, prayer, meditation, Yoga. My wish is that these songs bring softness, clarity, calm, and inspiration."

In September 2018, she premiered her new single "That Magic". The song serves as the lead single from her sixth studio album titled Worthy which was released on February 15, 2019.

In February 2022, Arie joined several artists to announce plans to remove her music from music service Spotify because it platformed Joe Rogan, a podcast host who repeatedly made false claims about the COVID-19 vaccine. According to media reports, Arie's planned departure from the service is over racial comments Rogan made.

Discography

Studio albums

2001: Acoustic Soul
2002: Voyage to India
2006: Testimony: Vol. 1, Life & Relationship
2009: Testimony: Vol. 2, Love & Politics
2013: Songversation
2015: Christmas with Friends
2019: Worthy

EP albums
2017: SongVersation: Medicine – EP

Collaborations
 2010 : Guitar Heaven: The Greatest Guitar Classics of All Time by Carlos Santana. – India sings While my guitar gently weeps with Yo Yo Ma on cello.
 2010 : The Imagine Project by Herbie Hancock. – India sings Imagine with Pink, Seal, Konono No. 1, Oumou Sangare and Jeff Beck.
 2020: " My Everything" by Sauti Sol - Midnight Train album

Awards

Grammy Award
The Grammy Award is an honor awarded by The Recording Academy to recognize outstanding achievement in the mainly English-language music industry. Arie has won four Grammy awards from twenty-three nominations.

|-
| rowspan="7" | 2002 || rowspan="2" | Acoustic Soul ||Album of the Year ||
|-
| Best R&B Album || 
|-
| rowspan="4" | "Video" || Record of the Year || 
|-
| Song of the Year || 
|-
| Best Female R&B Vocal Performance || 
|-
| Best R&B Song || 
|-
| India Arie || Best New Artist || 
|-
| rowspan="4" | 2003 || "The Christmas Song"  || Best Pop Collaboration with Vocals || 
|-
| "Little Things" || Best Urban/Alternative Performance || 
|-
| "Good Man" || Best R&B Song || 
|-
| Voyage to India || Best R&B Album || 
|-
| 2006 || "A Time to Love"  || Best Pop Collaboration with Vocals || 
|-
| rowspan="3" | 2007 || rowspan="2" | "I Am Not My Hair" || Best Female R&B Vocal Performance || 
|-
| Best R&B Song || 
|-
| Testimony: Vol. 1, Life & Relationships || Best R&B Album || 
|-
| 2008 || "Beautiful Flower" || Best R&B Song || 
|-
| 2009 || "Words"  || Best R&B Performance by a Duo or Group with Vocals || 
|-
| rowspan="3" | 2010 || "Chocolate High"  || Best R&B Performance by a Duo or Group with Vocals || 
|-
| Testimony Vol. 2, Love & Politics || Best R&B Album || 
|-
| "Pearls"  || Best Urban/Alternative Performance || 
|-
| 2011 || "Imagine"  || Best Pop Collaboration with Vocals || 
|-
| 2018 || "SongVersation: Medicine" || Best New Age Album || 
|-
| 2020 || "Steady Love" || Best Traditional R&B Performance || 
|-

BET Awards

|-
| 2001 || India Arie || Best New Artist || 
|-
| 2002 || India Arie || Best Female R&B Artist || 
|-
| 2003 || India Arie || Best Female R&B Artist || 
|-
| 2006 || India Arie || Best Female R&B Artist || 
|-

Soul Train Music Awards

|-
| rowspan="3" | 2002 || India Arie || Best New Artist || 
|-
| Acoustic Soul || Best R&B/Soul Album – Female || 
|-
| "Video" || Best R&B/Soul Single – Female || 
|-
| 2003 || "Little Things" || Best R&B/Soul Single – Female || 
|-
| 2007 || Testimony: Vol. 1, Life & Relationships || Best R&B/Soul Album – Female || 
|-

NAACP Image Award

|-
| rowspan="3" | 2002 || rowspan="2" | India Arie || Outstanding New Artist || 
|-
| Outstanding Female Artist || 
|-
| Acoustic Soul || Outstanding Album || 
|-
| rowspan="5" | 2003 || India Arie & Stevie Wonder || Outstanding Duo or Group || 
|-
| India Arie || Outstanding Female Artist || 
|-
| rowspan="2" | "Little Things" || Outstanding Music Video || 
|-
| Outstanding Song || 
|-
| Voyage to India || Outstanding Album || 
|-
| 2004 || "The Truth" || Outstanding Music Video || 
|-
| 2006 || India Arie || Outstanding Female Artist || 
|-
| rowspan="3" | 2007 || India Arie || Outstanding Female Artist || 
|-
| rowspan="2" | "I Am Not My Hair" || Outstanding Music Video || 
|-
| Outstanding Song || 
|-
| 2008 || "Beautiful Flower" || Outstanding Song || 
|-
| 2009 || India Arie & Anthony David || Outstanding Duo or Group || 
|-
| 2010 || India Arie || Outstanding Female Artist || 
|-
| rowspan="2" | 2014 || India Arie || Outstanding Female Artist || 
|-
| "Cocoa Butter" || Outstanding Music Video || 
|-

Tours

Headlining
Voyage to World Tour (2002/03)
Testimony Tour (2006/10)
Songversation Tour (2013/14)
Opening act
Lovers Rock Tour (2001)

Filmography

Theater
In 2009, India Arie portrayed Nina Simone in a staged reading at the Roundabout Theatre Company of the upcoming Broadway musical "Soul Doctor", about the life of Shlomo Carlebach written by Daniel Wise.

References

External links

Official website

1975 births
21st-century American guitarists
21st-century American women guitarists
21st-century American women singers
African-American women singer-songwriters
American contemporary R&B singers
American contraltos
American flautists
American neo soul singers
American people of Bissau-Guinean descent
American people of Fulbe descent
American people of Liberian descent
American people of Mende descent
American people of Sierra Leonean descent
Ballad musicians
Feminist musicians
Grammy Award winners
Guitarists from Colorado
Guitarists from Georgia (U.S. state)
Living people
Motown artists
Musicians from Atlanta
Musicians from Savannah, Georgia
Singers from Denver
Writers from Denver
Writers from Savannah, Georgia
African-American guitarists
21st-century African-American women
20th-century African-American people
20th-century African-American women
Singer-songwriters from Colorado
Singer-songwriters from Georgia (U.S. state)
21st-century flautists